This is a list of Australian soccer transfers for the 2022–23 A-League Men. Only moves featuring at least one A-League Men club are listed.

Clubs were able to sign players at any time, but many transfers will only officially go through on 1 June because the majority of player contracts finish on 31 May.

Transfers 

All players without a flag are Australian. Clubs without a flag are clubs participating in the A-League Men.

Pre-season

Mid-season

References

External links
Official A-League website

A-League Men transfers
transfers
Football transfers summer 2022
Football transfers winter 2022–23